is a Japanese former professional footballer who played as a forward. He is the currently assistant coach of Japan national team.

Club career
Maeda was born in Kobe, Japan but spent his childhood in the United States. He was educated at and played for Gyosei Junior and Senior High School in Tokyo. While he was a high school student, he was chosen as one of the Designated Players for Development by J.League and JFA. Because of this status, Maeda was able to register as a Verdy Kawasaki player while he was still eligible to play for his high school club. However, he did not play any official match for Verdy.

After graduating from his high school in 2000, he joined Júbilo Iwata. His first appearance as a professional player came on 3 May 2000 in a league match against Kawasaki Frontale. His first professional goal came on 28 August 2001 in a J.League Cup game against JEF United Ichihara. Although he could not play many matches behind Masashi Nakayama and Naohiro Takahara until 2002, he played as regular player from 2003. In the season 2009 was the J.League Top Scorer with twenty goals. In the 2010 season, Maeda became the top scorer again, netting 17 times. Júbilo also won the champions in 2010 J.League Cup. At 2010 J.League Cup Final, he scored two goals and was selected MVP award in the tournament. However Júbilo was relegated to J2 League end of 2013 season. In 2014, although he scored 17 goals, Júbilo finished at the 4th place and missed promotion to J1.

In 2015, Maeda moved to J1 club FC Tokyo. He played as regular player until 2016. However his opportunity to play decreased from 2017 and he could hardly score goals in the match.

In 2019, Maeda moved to J2 club FC Gifu.

Curse of Maeda
Since the 2007 season, for six straight seasons, each team Maeda scores his first goal of the league campaign against has eventually been relegated to J2 League. This has given rise to the so-called "curse of (Ryoichi) Maeda". It became a topic of wide public conversation in late 2012 as Gamba Osaka, the team that he scored his first goal of that season against, was in the relegation zone despite having not ranked lower than third in the previous three seasons. Consistent with the "curse", Gamba Osaka was relegated to J2 following the last game of the season in which they lost against, funnily enough, Jubilo Iwata 2–1 with Maeda scoring a goal and an assist. The curse came to an end by the end of the 2013 season, as Maeda's first goal of the 2013 season came in a loss to Urawa, who will not be relegated.

International career
Maeda played for Japan U20 at the 2001 FIFA World Youth Championship in Argentina. He also played for Japan U23 at the 2004 Summer Olympics qualification but failed to be picked up to the squad for the finals in Greece.

After impressive performance at club, Maeda made his international debut for Japan in a friendly against Cameroon on 22 August 2007 at Oita Stadium. He scored his first international goal on 17 October 2007 in a friendly against Egypt at Nagai Stadium in Osaka. In 2011, Maeda participated in his first major full international tournament at 2011 AFC Asian Cup in Qatar and started all six games in Japan's Asian Cup winning campaign. He was selected Japan for 2013 FIFA Confederations Cup. He played 33 games and scored 10 goals for Japan until 2013.

Career statistics

Club

International

Scores and results list Japan's goal tally first, score column indicates score after each Maeda goal.

Honours
Júbilo Iwata
J1 League: 2002
J.League Cup: 2010
Japanese Super Cup: 2003

Japan
AFC Asian Cup: 2011
Afro-Asian Cup of Nations: 2007

Individual
Asian Young Footballer of the Year: 2000
J.League Top Scorer: 2009, 2010
J.League Best XI: 2009, 2010
J.League Cup MVP: 2010

References

External links

 
 Japan National Football Team Database
 
 

1981 births
Living people
Association football people from Hyōgo Prefecture
Japanese footballers
Japan youth international footballers
Japan international footballers
J1 League players
J2 League players
J3 League players
Júbilo Iwata players
FC Tokyo players
FC Tokyo U-23 players
FC Gifu players
Footballers at the 2002 Asian Games
Asian Games medalists in football
Asian Games silver medalists for Japan
2011 AFC Asian Cup players
AFC Asian Cup-winning players
2013 FIFA Confederations Cup players
Asian Young Footballer of the Year winners
Association football forwards
Medalists at the 2002 Asian Games